Dallas is an American prime time television soap opera that revolves around the Ewings, a wealthy Texas family in the oil and cattle-ranching industries. The show was famous for its cliffhangers, including the "Who shot J.R.?" mystery and the "Dream Season".

The original miniseries (consisting of five episodes) from 1978 is now presented as "Season 1" in keeping with the initial release on DVD in 2004, although originally Season 1 officially began with the episode that aired on September 23, 1978. This article has been reformatted to list episodes by the current convention rather than original designation. Over its fourteen seasons, 357 episodes and four made-for-television movies and reunion specials aired.

Series overview

Episodes

Season 1 (1978)

Season 2 (1978–79)

Season 3 (1979–80)

Season 4 (1980–81)

Season 5 (1981–82)

Season 6 (1982–83)

Season 7 (1983–84)

Season 8 (1984–85)

Season 9 (1985–86)

Season 10 (1986–87)

Season 11 (1987–88)

Season 12 (1988–89)

Season 13 (1989–90)

Season 14 (1990–91)

Telefilms and reunions 

Non-fiction Specials

References 

General references 
 
 

Lists of soap opera episodes
Dallas
Lists of American drama television series episodes
Dallas (1978 TV series)